Faustin-Archange Touadéra (born 21 April 1957) is a Central African politician and academic who has been President of the Central African Republic since March 2016. He previously was Prime Minister of the Central African Republic from January 2008 to January 2013. In the December 2015 – February 2016 presidential election, he was elected to the presidency in a second round of voting against former Prime Minister Anicet Georges Dologuélé. He was re-elected for a second term on 27 December 2020.

Early life and education
Touadéra was born in Bangui; the son of a driver and a farmer, his family was originally from Damara, to the north of Bangui. He received his secondary education at the Barthelemy Boganda College in Bangui and obtained a baccalaureate in 1976, before attending the University of Bangui and the University of Abidjan. He earned a mathematics doctorate in 1986, supervised by Daniel Gourdin at the Lille University of Science and Technology (Lille I) in France and another doctorate, also in mathematics, which was supervised by Marcel Dossa at the University of Yaoundé I in Cameroon in 2004.

Academic career 
In 1987, he became assistant lecturer of mathematics at the University of Bangui and was vice-dean of the University's Faculty of Science from 1989 to 1992. In the latter year he became director of the teachers' training college. He joined the Inter-State Committee for the Standardisation of Mathematics Programs in the French-speaking countries and the Indian Ocean (CIEHPM) in 1999, serving as the president of the Committee from 2001 to 2003. He became vice chancellor of the University of Bangui in May 2004. Touadéra subsequently served as rector of the university from 2005 to 2008, during which time he launched several key initiatives, such as the entrepreneurship training program and the creation of the Euclid Consortium.

Political career

Prime Minister 
Touadéra was appointed as Prime Minister by President François Bozizé on 22 January 2008, following the resignation of Élie Doté. His government, composed of 29 members—four ministers of state, 17 ministers, and seven minister delegates, along with himself—was appointed on 28 January.

A national dialogue was held in December 2008, and Bozizé then dissolved Touadéra's government on 18 January 2009 in preparation for the formation of a government of national unity. Touadéra was reappointed as Prime Minister on 19 January. Later on the same day, his new 31-minister government was appointed, with only 10 ministers retaining their posts; many former rebels were included in the new lineup to prepare the country for the 2009 local elections and the 2010 presidential and parliamentary polls.

Following a peace deal between the Bozizé government and the Séléka rebel coalition in January 2013, Bozizé dismissed Touadéra on 12 January 2013, in accordance with the terms of the agreement, which required that a new prime minister be appointed from the political opposition.

Later, Touadéra announced his intention to stand as an independent candidate in the October 2015 presidential election.

EUCLID involvement and High Steward

In 2008, the Euclid Consortium initiative hosted by the University of Bangui led to the formation of an intergovernmental university named EUCLID (Euclid University) (French: Pôle Universitaire Euclide). In his capacity as Prime Minister, Touadera signed the instrument of participation for the Central African Republic in May 2010. His chief of cabinet, Simplice Sarandji also signed the headquarters agreement for EUCLID in March 2011.

In April 2012, Touadera personally presided over a graduation ceremony in New York, at the Permanent Mission of the Central African Republic to the United Nations, for a graduating diplomat of Burundi. After his tenure as Prime Minister, Touadera became EUCLID's High Steward, an honorary role.

President

Touadéra stood as a candidate in the December 2015–February 2016 presidential election. After finishing second in the first round of voting, he received the support of the majority of defeated candidates for the second round, which he won with 62% of the vote. He was sworn in on 30 March 2016. Speaking on the occasion, he vowed to pursue disarmament and "make CAR a united country, a country of peace, a country facing development". He appointed Simplice Sarandji as Prime Minister on 2 April 2016. Sarandji was Touadéra's campaign manager during the election and Touadéra's chief of staff during his own time as Prime Minister.

After he was sworn into office, France confirmed that it would end its military intervention in Central African Republic. France had around 2,500 troops deployed in the country as part of Operation Sangaris, supporting about 10,000 United Nations peacekeepers. Without France's support, Touadéra  faced the immediate challenge of maintaining security in major cities.

The Central African Republic saw a 36 percent drop in its gross domestic product in 2013. The economy has slowly grown since then, but the agricultural sector — the main contributor to GDP — is still struggling and the government is struggling to raise revenues.

Faustin-Archange Touadera's personal security detail is reportedly composed of members of the Russian Wagner Group.

Ministry 
He was a deacon in a Baptist church of the Fraternal Union of Baptist Churches. and is still a member of this union.

Personal life 
Touadéra is married to both Brigitte Touadéra and Marguerite "Tina" Touadéra. Both women had reportedly been vying for the title of First Lady of the Central African Republic behind the scenes. Faustin-Archange Touadéra has three children.

References

|-

1957 births
Living people
People from Bangui
Heads of state of the Central African Republic
Prime Ministers of the Central African Republic
People of the Central African Republic Civil War
Lille University of Science and Technology alumni
Academic staff of the University of Bangui
Baptist deacon